How to Look Good Naked is a television program, first aired on British Channel 4 in 2006, in which fashion stylist Gok Wan encourages women and men who are insecure with their bodies to strip nude for the camera. The programme is unique among other similar makeover shows in that it never encourages participants to undergo cosmetic surgery or lose weight. The US format premiered on Lifetime Television in 2008 with Carson Kressley hosting, it was the #1 Unscripted Show on the network at the time.

On 27 June 2019, it was announced that the show would be revived by Really with Gok Wan returning as host. This would be the channel's first commission since its acquisition by Discovery.

Format 
The format of the show is based on activities designed to build a woman's self-esteem and self-confidence. These include photographing the woman naked and then displaying a very large picture of the woman's body in a public place, such as projected onto the side of a building or on the side of a van, and asking passers-by what they think of them. Viewers typically respond very positively, which builds the woman's self-esteem. Wan burns the woman's current underwear and then replaces it with more flattering underwear, including "tummy tuck pants". At the end of each episode, Wan asks the woman to walk down the modeling catwalk showing her new nude look to family and friends.

In more recent episodes, Wan has used a variety of very personal tactics designed to encourage women to love their bodies and feel sexy. He has had women pose naked in London shop windows, stopped women on the street and asked if they have Lady Lines, published the image of a semi-naked woman on the front of a fake newspaper titled Naked News, and then handed the newspaper out on a busy London street. At the end of each catwalk show, the woman is encouraged to strip naked on stage to show how far they had come in terms of body confidence.

Catchphrases 
Wan's favourite and most famous catchphrases include "bangers", which is slang for breasts, and "gorgeous", often calling the women participating in the show "girlfriend". Many of his other catchphrases are puns on his name, such as "Gok shock" and "fairy Gok mother". In his most recent series, Wan has introduced a new feature aimed at giving style and beauty advice to men, which he calls "Wan for the boys".

Series guide 
Series 1: Eight 30 minute episodesfirst shown from 27 June 2006
Series 2: Eight 30 minute episodesfirst shown from 1 May 2007
Series 3: Eight 30 minute episodesfirst shown from 14 November 2007
Series 4: Seven 30 minute episodes + six 60 minute revisitsfirst shown from 8 April 2008

American Series:
Series 1 : Eight 30 minute episodes
Series 2 : Eight 60 minute episodes

Versions in other countries 
The U.S. version of How to Look Good Naked airs on Lifetime, and is hosted by Carson Kressley. The show was promoted on The Oprah Winfrey Show, in addition to receiving rave reviews from the New York Times and the L.A. Times. Its premiere was the biggest in the network's 24-year history.  The US version has aired on Network Ten in Australia and E4 in the United Kingdom.

In Belgium, there is a show called Look Good or Nicely Naked.

There is also a Swedish version called Snygg Naken, an Italian version called Nude e Belle, an Israeli version called בעירום מלא (Be'erom Mal'e), a French version, Belle toute nue, which began on the M6 channel on 9 December 2008, and Polish version called Jak dobrze wyglądać nago, which will begin on TVN Style channel in March 2009.

In late 2009/early 2010, the Canadian version of How to Look Good Naked premiered and currently runs on the W Network, on which the UK version once aired. It is hosted by Zain Meghji.

Since 2010 there is also a Czech version called Nahá jsi krásná (Naked you're beautiful) hosted by Libor Šula.

External links 
 
 
 How to Look Good Naked on Lifetime Television
 How to Look Good Naked Canada on W Network

2006 British television series debuts
2010s British television series
Channel 4 original programming
English-language television shows
Fashion-themed reality television series
Nudity in television
Lifetime (TV network) original programming
Television series by All3Media
Television series by Banijay
British fashion
2000s British reality television series
2010s British reality television series